Loury may refer to:

People
 Glenn Loury (born 1948), American economist
 Jeanne Loury (1876–1951), French actress
 Linda Datcher Loury (1952–2011), American economist
 Pierre Loury, American teen killed by Chicago police in 2016

Places
 Loury, Loiret, France